Khmer(s) may refer to:

Cambodia
Srok Khmer (lit. "Khmer land" or "Land of the Khmer(s)"), a colloquial exonym used to refer to Cambodia by Cambodians; see 

Khmer people, the ethnic group to which the great majority of Cambodians belong
Khmer Americans, Americans of Khmer (Cambodian) ancestry
Khmer Krom, Khmer people living in the Mekong Delta and Southeast Vietnam
Khmer Loeu, the Mon-Khmer highland tribes in Cambodia
Northern Khmer people, ethnic Khmer people of Northeast Thailand
Khmer (Unicode block), a block of Unicode characters of the Khmer script
Khmer architecture, the architecture of Cambodia
Khmer cuisine, the dominant cuisine in Cambodia
Khmer Empire, which ruled much of Indochina from the 9th to the 13th centuries 
Khmer Issarak, anti-French, Khmer nationalist political movement formed in 1945
Khmer language, the language of the Khmers, also the official and national language of Cambodia
Khmer Khe dialect, a Khmeric language spoken in Stung Treng Province, Cambodia
Northern Khmer dialect, a dialect of the Khmer language spoken by the ethnic Khmers in Northeast Thailand
Western Khmer dialect, a dialect of the Khmer language spoken by the Khmers native to the Cardamom Mountains
Khmer nationalism, a form of nationalism founded in Cambodia
Khmer Republic, the official name of Cambodia from 1970 to 1975
Khmer Sâ (White Khmer), a pro-US force formed by the Khmer Republic's defence minister Sak Sutsakhan
Khmer script, the script used to write the Khmer and Khmer Loeu languages
Khmer Serei, anti-communist and anti-monarchist guerrilla force founded by Cambodian nationalist Son Ngoc Thanh
Political terms coined by Norodom Sihanouk based on the word 'Khmer':
Khmer Bleu, Sihanouk's domestic opponents on the right
Khmer Rouge, a Cambodian Communist political group and guerrilla movement
Khmer Việt Minh, Cambodian communists who lived in exile in North Vietnam after the 1954 Geneva Conference

Other uses
Khmer (album), a 1997 jazz album by Nils Petter Molvær
Khmer (food), traditional dish native to Jizan, Saudi Arabia
Khmer: The Lost Empire of Cambodia, a 1997 nonfiction book by Thierry Zéphir

See also
 
Khemara (disambiguation)

Language and nationality disambiguation pages